Port Williams may refer to:

 In Nova Scotia
 Port Williams, Nova Scotia (Kings County)
 Port Williams, Annapolis County, see Port Lorne
 Port Williams, Alaska, location of Port Williams Seaplane Base
 Port Williams, Kansas
 Port Williams, Washington
 Puerto Williams, at the southern end of Chile